Shenanigans is a compilation album by American rock band Green Day, released on July 2, 2002, by Reprise Records. The album contains B-sides, rarities, covers, and the previously unreleased track "Ha Ha You're Dead". "Espionage", a spy-themed instrumental, was featured on the soundtrack for Austin Powers: The Spy Who Shagged Me and "Tired of Waiting for You", their cover of the Kinks song of the same name, was featured on the soundtrack for the 1997 film Private Parts. 

Shenanigans peaked at number 27 on the US Billboard 200 upon its release and has sold 280,000 units as of September 2010. Even though the original cover does not feature a title, several retailers fixed confusion over it by designing a sticker which was plastered on the front. In a September 2009 interview by Fuse on Demand, when asked who designed the cover for the group's eighth studio album 21st Century Breakdown (2009), Billie Joe Armstrong said that Chris Bilheimer designed it as well as the last four album covers. In 2002, Green Day embarked on the Pop Disaster Tour in support of the album; however, no songs from the album were played during any of the performances.

The album was supposed to included track "D.U.I." (written and sung by Tré Cool), but later it was removed, it was only available on unmastered copies of the album.

Track listing

Personnel
Green Day
 Billie Joe Armstrong – lead vocals, guitar
 Mike Dirnt – bass guitar, backing vocals, baseball bats on "Desensitized" and co-lead vocals on "Outsider"
 Tré Cool – drums, percussion, lead vocals on "D.U.I." (promotional unmastered copies only)

Production
 Rob Cavallo – producer
Green Day – producers
 Jerry Finn – mixing on "You Lied", "Don't Wanna Fall in Love", "I Want to Be on T.V.", "Tired of Waiting for You", "Rotting", "Do Da Da", "On the Wagon"
 Kevin Army – engineer on "You Lied", "Don't Wanna Fall in Love", "I Want to Be on T.V.", "Rotting", "Do Da Da"
 Neill King – engineering on "Tired of Waiting for You", "On the Wagon", mixing on "Sick of Me"
 Ken Allardyce – engineering on "Suffocate", "Desentitized", "Espionage", "Sick of Me"
 Chris Dugan – engineering on "Ha Ha You're Dead"
 Casey McKrankin – additional engineering on "Tired of Waiting for You" and "On the Wagon"
 Willie Samuels – engineering on "Outsider", "Scumbag", "Ha Ha You're Dead"
 Chris Lord-Alge – mixing on "Suffocate", "Desentitized", "Espionage", "Sick of Me"
 Steve Hall – mastering on "Suffocate", "Desentitized", "Espionage", "Sick of Me"
 Bob Ludwig – mastering on "You Lied", "Don't Wanna Fall in Love", "I Want to Be on T.V.", "Rotting", "Do Da Da"
 Robert Vosgein – mastering on "Outsider", "Scumbag", "Ha Ha You're Dead"

Charts

Weekly charts

Year-end charts

Certifications and sales

References

External links

Shenanigans at YouTube (streamed copy where licensed)

Green Day compilation albums
2002 compilation albums
B-side compilation albums
Reprise Records compilation albums
Albums produced by Rob Cavallo
Skate punk albums